Panama elects on national level a head of state, i.e. the president,  and a legislature. The president and the vice-president are elected on one ballot for a five-year term by the people. The National Assembly (Asamblea Nacional) has 71 members, elected for a five-year term in single-seat and multi-seat constituencies.

Political culture 

Panama has a multi-party system, with numerous parties in which no one party often has a chance of gaining power alone, and parties must work with each other to form coalition governments.

Schedule

Election

Inauguration

Latest elections

President

National Assembly

See also
Politics of Panama

References

External links
Adam Carr's Election Archive